Paul (Douglas) Gardner (born 28 May 1950) is a Christian priest and author.

Gardner was educated at Leeds Grammar School, King's College London and Ridley Hall, Cambridge. He was ordained deacon in 1980, and priest in 1981.; After a curacy at, St Martin, Cambridge he was a Lecturer at Oak Hill Theological College. He was vicar of St John the Baptist, Hartford, Cheshire from 1990 to 2003; archdeacon of Exeter from 2003 to 2005 and senior minister of Christ Church Presbyterian Church, Atlanta, Georgia from 2005 to 2017.

References

1950 births
People educated at Leeds Grammar School
Alumni of King's College London
Alumni of Ridley Hall, Cambridge
Archdeacons of Exeter
Living people